Ian L. Gray AM (born 1950) is a retired Victorian lawyer, and former judge, chief magistrate and State Coroner at the Coroners Court of Victoria.

Education
Gray completed a Bachelor of Arts and a Bachelor of Laws at Monash University, graduating in 1973.

Career
He initially practised as a private solicitor, before beginning work as a community lawyer in a Community Legal Service and at the Victorian Aboriginal Legal Service. In 1982, he was admitted to the Victorian Bar and practiced as a barrister, specialising in criminal law.

In 1987, Gray was appointed as the Principal Legal Advisor for the Northern Land Council in Darwin. 

In 1990, Gray was appointed a magistrate in the Northern Territory. By 1992, he was Chief Magistrate of the Northern Territory. In that role he took issue with a government policy of mandatory sentencing for property offences  and, as a coroner, dealt with the first case of a euthanasia death under the NT Rights of the Terminally Ill Act 1995. 

From 1995 to 1997, Gray served on the national Council for Aboriginal Reconciliation as a representative of the Northern Territory. In 1998, he returned to the Victorian bar, specialising in criminal, administrative and employment law. In 2000, Gray was appointed as head of the Land and Property Unit of the United Nations Transitional Administration in East Timor (UNTAET). This role involved leading an international team working on the development of a modern land law system, and rules for resolving land disputes, in the post- conflict nation. He has since maintained a close connection with Timor Leste.

In March 2001, he was appointed Chief Magistrate of the Magistrates' Court of Victoria, where he led over 100 magistrates, covering 52 locations across the State of Victoria. Among Gray's initiatives was opening the Court to live filming of case hearings for a national TV series titled The Code: Crime and Justice in 2007. On 29 November 2012, he was appointed a judge of the County Court of Victoria and commenced his appointment as State Coroner of Victoria the same day. 

From 2013 to 2015 Gray chaired the RMIT University B. Juris Doctor advisory board. He has been an adjunct professor at Victoria University since 2010.

Chief Magistrate of Victoria
During Gray's time in office, a number of major reforms were made at the Magistrates' Court. The establishment of innovative new specialist courts, such as the Drug Court, the Family Violence Court and the Koori Court, are a few examples of the type of change which Gray oversaw.

County Court and State Coroner
In 2012, Gray was appointed to the County Court and made State Coroner of Victoria, replacing Jennifer Coate. As State Coroner he conducted a number of high profile investigations including the inquests into the deaths of Luke Batty and Jill Meagher. His recommendations in the Luke Batty case were supported in the findings of Australia’s first royal commission into family violence in 2016 

Gray retired as State Coroner (and County Court judge) at the end of 2015. In 2018-2019 he served as the inaugural Chair of the Victorian Post Sentence Authority, established after a spate of parolee murders in Melbourne to monitor the post- release compliance by serious offenders with Supervision orders made by Courts.

Order of Australia
In June 2021, Gray was made a member of the Order of Australia (AM) for “significant service to the law, and to indigenous justice”.

References

Australian magistrates
Judges from Melbourne
20th-century Australian judges
21st-century Australian judges
Monash Law School alumni
1950s births
Living people
Year of birth uncertain